Agustin Perez may refer to:

 Agustin Pérez (bishop) (died 1286), Roman Catholic prelate
 Agustín Pérez (footballer) (born 1991), Argentine goalkeeper
 Agustín Pérez Soriano (1846–1907), Spanish composer